is a Japanese surname.

Notable people 
 , mathematician
, Japanese footballer
 , Japanese samurai
 , Japanese classical composer
 , manga artist
 , Japanese classical violinist
 , Japanese racing driver and journalist
 , Japanese basketball player
 , Japanese racing driver
 , Imperial Japanese Army officer
 , Japanese samurai
 , Japanese footballer
 , Sumo wrestler
 , Japanese television personality
 , a Japanese student shot and killed in Baton Rouge, Louisiana, United States
 , Japanese businessman
 , Japanese businessman and watchmaker, founder of Seiko

Fictional characters 
, a character from Japanese manga Case Closed (Detective Conan)
 Ninja Hattori-kun,  a Japanese manga series written and illustrated by duo Fujiko Fujio

Other uses
 Hattori Hanzō (disambiguation)
 Hattori–Stong theorem
 Hattori Nutrition College, a cooking school in Tokyo
 Hattori Racing Enterprises, a NASCAR team
 Hattori Ryokuchi Park in Osaka
 Hattori Shoten, a Tokyo-based publisher, an early publisher of Natsume Sōseki's I Am a Cat in English and Japanese.
 K. Hattori, a shop

Japanese-language surnames